The 2009 Almaty Cup was a professional tennis tournament played on outdoor hard courts. It was the third edition of the tournament which was part of the 2009 ATP Challenger Tour. It took place in Almaty, Kazakhstan between 24 and 30 August 2009.

Singles entrants

Seeds

 Rankings are as of August 17, 2009.

Other entrants
The following players received wildcards into the singles main draw:
  Syrym Abdulkhalikov
  Danjil Braun
  Aidynbek Rakhishev
  Serizhan Yessenbekov

The following players received entry from the qualifying draw:
  Sadik Kadir
  Mikhail Ledovskikh
  James McGee
  Denys Molchanov

Champions

Singles

 Ivan Sergeyev def.  Dustin Brown, 6–3, 5–7, 6–4

Doubles

 Denys Molchanov /  Yang Tsung-hua def.  Pierre-Ludovic Duclos /  Alexey Kedryuk, 4–6, 7–6(5), [11–9]

External links
ITF Search 

Almaty Cup
Almaty Cup